Frits F.W. Prinzen is an expert on cardiac pacing therapies, both for bradycardia and for heart failure (cardiac resynchronisation therapy, CRT).

Early life and education

He was born July 2 1954, in Hilversum.  He earned a master's degree in medical biology from Utrecht University in 1978, and a PhD in physiology from Maastricht University in 1982.

Career 
Prinzen works on cardiac pacing therapies, both for bradycardia and for heart failure (cardiac resynchronisation therapy, CRT). His main research topic is cardiac mechanics and long-term structural and functional adaptations to various conditions, with emphasis on asynchronous electrical activation and cardiac resynchronisation.

In 1995, he took a sabbatical year during which he worked at the Johns Hopkins University in Baltimore, MD, USA, where he dove into the world of MRI tagging of the heart. This work was published in a well-cited article in the Journal of the American College of Cardiology.

Societal impact 
His work led to improved cardiological treatments, especially in the field of cardiac pacing. Together with cardiologists and industrial partners he improved and developed pacemakers, pacing wires, and implantation methods. An  example is published in NEJM in 2007, describing the case of a child with heart failure who directly benefited by changing the site of the pacemaker wire. This theory was later confirmed in a large clinical trial, published in 2013 in Circulation. In his lab of it was shown for the first time that pacing the left side of the interventricular septum maintained cardiac function. This pacing strategy has been adopted in clinical practice. Frits was awarded the CARIM commitment award in 2016.

Published work 
Frits Prinzen is co-author of over 280 scientific articles, with over 16,000 citations and an all time H-index of 70.

He contributed to Clinical Cardiac Pacing, Defibrillation and Resynchronization Therapy.

References

External links 

 Overview at peer reviewed Publications at Pubmed

1954 births
Living people
Academic staff of Maastricht University
People from Hilversum
Cardiovascular researchers
Utrecht University alumni
Maastricht University alumni